The Hurricane is a 1926 American silent drama film directed by John Frederick Caldwell and starring Alice Lake, Stuart Holmes and Jack Richardson.

Cast
 Alice Lake as The Wife
 Stuart Holmes as The Smuggler
 Jack Richardson as The Husband
 Muriel Reynolds	
 George Foster	
 John Frederick Caldwell
 Donald Edwards

References

Bibliography
 Munden, Kenneth White. The American Film Institute Catalog of Motion Pictures Produced in the United States, Part 1. University of California Press, 1997.

External links
 

1926 films
1926 drama films
1920s English-language films
American silent feature films
Silent American drama films
American black-and-white films
1920s American films